Fay White is an Australian  singer, songwriter and community facilitator. Her album Did You See the Wind Today? was nominated for the ARIA Award for Best Children's Album in 1989.

Discography
Timshel (1979)
Sink or Sing (1983)
Did You See the Wind Today? (1988) - Move Records
Trees Stars and Other Wonders (1988)
Soil Ain't Dirt (1989)
Singing Landcare
These People, This Place: everyday grace (2011)

Fay White, Family & Friends 
A Gift To Be Simple
Sweet Journey

Fay White and Jane Thompson  
Songs with Legs

Awards and nominations

ARIA Music Awards

References

External links

Australian women singers
Living people
Year of birth missing (living people)